John Harriman may refer to:

John Harriman (botanist) (1760–1831), English botanist
John Harriman (Star Trek), a fictional Star Trek captain
John Emery Harriman, inventor of an aerocar in 1906

See also
 John Harriman House, a historic house in West Virginia